Fayetteville is an unincorporated community and census-designated place (CDP) in Franklin County, Pennsylvania, United States. The population was 3,208 at the 2020 census.

History
A post office called Fayetteville has been in operation since 1826. The community has the name of Gilbert du Motier, Marquis de Lafayette (1757–1834), American Revolutionary War general.

Geography
Fayetteville is located in eastern Franklin County at  (39.911912, -77.563492). U.S. Route 30 passes through the community, leading east  to Gettysburg and west  to Chambersburg, the Franklin County seat. Conococheague Creek, a tributary of the Potomac River, forms the northern edge of the community.

Demographics

As of the census of 2000, there were 2,774 people, 1,108 households, and 809 families residing in the CDP. The population density was 851.2 people per square mile (328.5/km). There were 1,147 housing units at an average density of 352.0/sq mi (135.8/km). The racial makeup of the CDP was 95.53% White, 2.27% African American, 0.25% Native American, 0.29% Asian, 0.25% from other races, and 1.41% from two or more races. Hispanic or Latino of any race were 0.87% of the population.

There were 1,108 households, out of which 29.2% had children under the age of 18 living with them, 62.7% were married couples living together, 8.3% had a female householder with no husband present, and 26.9% were non-families. 22.7% of all households were made up of individuals, and 10.3% had someone living alone who was 65 years of age or older. The average household size was 2.43 and the average family size was 2.85.

In the CDP, the population was spread out, with 21.7% under the age of 18, 5.9% from 18 to 24, 26.8% from 25 to 44, 25.2% from 45 to 64, and 20.3% who were 65 years of age or older. The median age was 42 years. For every 100 females, there were 93.3 males. For every 100 females age 18 and over, there were 90.9 males.

The median income for a household in the CDP was $46,014, and the median income for a family was $49,944. Males had a median income of $35,398 versus $22,773 for females. The per capita income for the CDP was $19,537. About 4.1% of families and 4.3% of the population were below the poverty line, including 4.8% of those under age 18 and 10.0% of those age 65 or over.

Notable people
Tom Brookens, third baseman for the Major League Baseball Detroit Tigers, New York Yankees, and Cleveland Indians.
Benjamin Franklin Heintzleman, governor of the Alaska Territory.
 Newman Raimer, Civil War soldier of the famous 54th Massachusetts Infantry Regiment.
Jean Stapleton, professional actress.

References

Census-designated places in Franklin County, Pennsylvania
Census-designated places in Pennsylvania